Jarrod Pickett (18 August 1996) is a former Australian rules footballer playing for the Carlton Football Club in the Australian Football League (AFL). He was drafted by the Greater Western Sydney Giants with their first selection and fourth overall in the 2014 national draft. After two seasons with the Giants and failing to play a senior match, he was traded to Carlton during the 2016 trade period. He made his debut in the forty-three point loss against  in the opening round of the 2017 season at the Melbourne Cricket Ground. Pickett managed 17 games across the 2017 and 2018 seasons for Carlton, but spent a significant period sidelined with injury in late 2018. On June 11, 2019, Carlton announced that Pickett had been released from his contract.

References

External links

 

1996 births
Living people
Carlton Football Club players
Preston Football Club (VFA) players
South Fremantle Football Club players
Australian rules footballers from Western Australia
Indigenous Australian players of Australian rules football
People educated at Melville Senior High School